Wilfred Hiram "Wiffy" Cox (October 27, 1896 – February 20, 1969) was an American professional golfer who played on the PGA Tour in the 1930s.

Cox was born and grew up in a tough Irish-Italian section of Brooklyn, New York. He started in golf as a caddie at Westchester County courses and learned to play at sunrise and sunset with clubs borrowed from the pro shop. The diminutive Cox had a hot-temper and a reputation for foul-mouthed, trash talk among his fellow players.

Cox won nine times on the PGA Tour. His first individual win on the PGA Tour came at the 1931 North and South Open; his four wins that year led the PGA Tour for most wins. His best finish in a major championship was tied for third at the 1934 U.S. Open.

Cox played on the winning U.S. team in the 1931 Ryder Cup, winning both his matches.

Like most professional golfers of his generation, Cox earned his living primarily as a club pro. He was the course pro at Dyker Beach Golf Course in Brooklyn, New York from 1921 to 1935. He eventually landed a plum job as head pro at the Congressional Country Club in Bethesda, Maryland, which he held until 1969. He died in Washington, D.C.

Professional wins (12)

PGA Tour wins (9)
1930 Mid-South Open Bestball (with Willie Macfarlane)
1931 Miami International Four-Ball (with Willie Macfarlane), North and South Open, Massachusetts Open, San Francisco National Match Play Open
1934 Agua Caliente Open, Texas Open
1936 Sacramento Open
1937 District Open

Other wins (3)
1931 Florida Open (tie with Joe Turnesa)
1942 Maryland Open
1943 Long Island PGA Championship

Results in major championships

Note: Cox never played in The Open Championship.

NYF = tournament not yet founded
WD = withdrew
CUT = missed the half-way cut
R64, R32, R16, QF, SF = round in which player lost in PGA Championship match play
"T" indicates a tie for a place

See also
List of golfers with most PGA Tour wins

References

American male golfers
PGA Tour golfers
Ryder Cup competitors for the United States
Golfers from New York (state)
Golfers from Maryland
Sportspeople from Brooklyn
1896 births
1969 deaths